Acylsilanes are a group of chemical compounds sharing a common functional group with the general structure R(CO)-SiR3. Acylsilanes are starting compounds in the Brook rearrangement with vinyl lithium compounds to silyl enol ethers.

Synthesis 
Acylsilanes can be synthesized using the following procedures:

Starting with the 1,3-dithiane, substituting with the silyl group, then removing the dithioacetal group with mercury(II) chloride and hydrolysis. This method also can make acylgermanes using the appropriate halogermane reagents.

Another method was reported by Kuwajima et al. using 1,1-bis(trimethylsilyl)alkan-1-ols. t-Butyl hypochlorite converts the starting material to the acylsilane.

References 

Functional groups
Organosilicon compounds